Atalaia may refer to:

Places

Brazil
 Atalaia, Alagoas, a municipality in the State of Alagoas
 Atalaia Nova, a beach in the municipality of Barra dos Coqueiros, State of Sergipe
 Atalaia Velha, a beach in the municipality of Aracaju, State of Sergipe

Portugal
 Atalaia (Gavião), a parish in the municipality of Gavião
 , a parish in the municipality of Lourinhã
 , a former parish in the municipality of Montijo
 , a parish in the municipality of Pinhel
 , a parish in the municipality of Vila Nova da Barquinha

Other
 Atalaia, Cape Verde, a village on the island of Fogo
 , a small peak on Selvagem Grande in the Savage Islands
 Castle of Atalaia
 Church of Atalaia

See also
 Atalaya (disambiguation)